Engelbert Jarek (7 June 1935 – 23 August 2017) was a Polish footballer. He was part of Poland's squad at the 1960 Summer Olympics, but he did not play in any matches.

References

1935 births
2017 deaths
Association football forwards
Polish footballers
Olympic footballers of Poland
Footballers at the 1960 Summer Olympics
Odra Opole players
Poland international footballers
Polish football managers
Odra Opole managers
Sportspeople from Zabrze